Monica Seles was the defending champion but lost in the quarterfinals to Brenda Schultz-McCarthy.

There was no result for the tournament due to rain. The finalists were Arantxa Sánchez Vicario and Jana Novotná, who would also reach the final of the same event a year later (Novotná winning in straight sets).

Seeds
A champion seed is indicated in bold text while text in italics indicates the round in which that seed was eliminated. The top four seeds received a bye to the second round.

  Monica Seles (quarterfinals)
  Jana Novotná (final)
  Iva Majoli (second round)
  Arantxa Sánchez Vicario (final)
  Mary Joe Fernández (first round)
  Irina Spîrlea (quarterfinals)
  Kimberly Po (second round)
  Brenda Schultz-McCarthy (semifinals)

Draw

Final

Section 1

Section 2

External links
 1997 Direct Line International Championships Draw

Eastbourne International
1997 WTA Tour